The CMLL World Micro-Estrellas Championship (Campeonato Mundial Micro-Estrellas de CMLL in Spanish) is a professional wrestling championship promoted by the Mexican lucha libre wrestling-based promotion Consejo Mundial de Lucha Libre (CMLL; Spanish for "World Wrestling Council"). The championship is exclusively competed for in the Micro-Estrellas, or Micros, division where all competitors have dwarfism.

The championship was revealed on December 11, 2019. It is the first Mexican-based championship solely for wrestlers with dwarfism.  As it is a professional wrestling championship, it is not won legitimately; it is instead won via a scripted ending to a match or awarded to a wrestler because of a storyline. Chamuel was the inaugural champion. He won a six-man torneo cibernetico elimination match on December 25, 2019.

Background
In the early days, popular wrestlers included Gran Nikolai, Pequeno Goliath and Arturito. By the 1980s midget wrestling was less popular in Mexico, especially since few new wrestlers had joined the division. In the early 1990s Consejo Mundial de Lucha Libre (CMLL), created a new concept, the Mini-Estrella division. The division was created by Antonio Peña, who worked for CMLL at the time; he came up with the idea of using both wrestlers with dwarfism and wrestlers who were simply very short, and to have those Mini-Estrellas work as smaller versions of popular wrestlers of the time. Peña and CMLL created the CMLL World Mini-Estrella Championship in 1992, which is considered the official birth of the division. CMLL's Mini-Estrellas division featured a number of skilled, high-flying wrestlers, which helped make the concept an immediate success, replacing midget wrestling with the Mini-Estrellas division in Mexico.

On April 30, 2017, CMLL began promoting a series of matches for the Micro-Estrellas ("Micro Stars") division, with all competitors being people with dwarfism. In the first match in the new division, Microman and Gallito defeated the team of Mije and Zacarías el Perico. The match even had a micro referee, as would the Micro-Estrella matches going forward. Prior to the match Gallito, Mije and Zacarías had worked as mascotas for various CMLL wrestlers and got physically involved in matches, but they hardly ever wrestled. In subsequent years the Micro-Estrellas became a regular feature on CMLL shows, leading to the first Micro-Estrellas lucha de apuestas, mask vs. mask match between Microman and Chamuel at the CMLL 86th Anniversary Show. In that match, Chamuel lost and was forced to unmask. On the December 11, 2019, Informa show CMLL introduced the CMLL World Micro-Estrellas Championship and unveiled the size-appropriate championship belt. 
Chamuel was the first CMLL World Micro-Estrellas Champion, having won a six-man torneo cibernetico elimination match on December 25, 2019, to become the inaugural champion.

As with all professional wrestling championships, matches for the CMLL World Micro-Estrellas Championship are not won or lost competitively, but by a pre-planned ending to a match, with the outcome determined by the CMLL bookers and match makers. On occasion the promotion declares a championship vacant, which means there is no champion at that time. This can either be due to a storyline or real-life issues such as a champion suffering an injury or leaving the company. The championship is the first exclusively for people with dwarfism in Mexico. Similar championships have been promoted in the United States, such as the NWA World Midget's Championship, and Mini-Estrella championships have been promoted in Mexico since 1992, but those are not exclusively for wrestlers with dwarfism.

Title history

Tournaments

2019
CMLL held a six-man torneo cibernetico elimination match featuring Microman, Chamuel El Gallito, Zacarías el Perico, Guapito, and Átomo on December 25, 2019 to determine the first CMLL World Micro-Estrellas Champion. The first wrestler eliminated was Átomo, pinned by Zacarías. Eliminations two through four were: Guapito (by El Gallito), Zacarías (by Microman) and El Gallito (by Chamuel). In the end Chamuel pinned longtime rival Microman to win the match and the championship.

Bibliography

Footnotes

References

Consejo Mundial de Lucha Libre championships
Midget wrestling championships
World professional wrestling championships